Lieutenant Colonel William Acton (1789 – 10 April 1854) was an Irish Conservative Party politician.

Acton was educated at Trinity College, Dublin. He was elected at the 1841 general election as the Member of Parliament (MP) for Wicklow,
having unsuccessfully contested the seat in 1832 and 1837. 
He was re-elected unopposed in 1847, but  resigned the following year
by taking the Chiltern Hundreds.

References

External links 
 

1789 births
1854 deaths
Members of the Parliament of the United Kingdom for County Wicklow constituencies (1801–1922)
UK MPs 1841–1847
UK MPs 1847–1852
Irish Conservative Party MPs
Alumni of Trinity College Dublin